Charles W. Parker may refer to:

Charles William Parker (1912–1997), clergyman and politician in British Columbia, Canada
Charles Wolcott Parker (1862–1948), judge in New Jersey 
Charles Wallace Parker, builder of the C. W. Parker Carousel

See also
Charles Parker (disambiguation)